Victory Building may refer to the following places:
Victory Building (Hastings, Nebraska), listed on the National Register of Historic Places
Victory Building (Cleveland, Ohio), listed on the National Register of Historic Places
New York Mutual Life Insurance Company Building, in Philadelphia, also known as the Victory Building or The Victory